Parmer County is a county located in the southwestern Texas Panhandle on the High Plains of the Llano Estacado in the U.S. state of Texas. As of the 2020 census, the population was 9,869. The county seat is Farwell. The county was created in 1876 and later organized in 1907. It is named in honor of Martin Parmer, a signer of the Texas Declaration of Independence and early judge. Parmer County was one of 10 prohibition, or entirely dry, counties in the state of Texas, but is now a wet county.

Geography

Major highways
  U.S. Highway 60
  U.S. Highway 70
  U.S. Highway 84
  State Highway 86
  State Highway 214

Adjacent counties
 Deaf Smith County (north)
 Castro County (east)
 Lamb County (southeast)
 Bailey County (south)
 Curry County, New Mexico (west/Mountain Time Zone)

Demographics

Note: the US Census treats Hispanic/Latino as an ethnic category. This table excludes Latinos from the racial categories and assigns them to a separate category. Hispanics/Latinos can be of any race.

As of the census of 2000,  10,016 people, 3,322 households, and 2,614 families resided in the county.  The population density was 11 people per square mile (4/km2).  The 3,732 housing units averaged four per square mile (2/km2).  The racial makeup of the county was 66.01% White, 1.01% Black or African American, 0.76% Native American, 0.32% Asian, 0.04% Pacific Islander, 29.51% from other races, and 2.35% from two or more races.  About 49.19% of the population was Hispanic or Latino of any race.

Of the 3,322 households, 42.9% had children under the age of 18 living with them, 67.0% were married couples living together, 8.3% had a female householder with no husband present, and 21.3% were not families. About 19.3% of all households were made up of individuals, and 10.5% had someone living alone who was 65 years of age or older.  The average household size was 2.97 and the average family size was 3.43.

In the county, the population was distributed as 32.9% under the age of 18, 8.5% from 18 to 24, 26.2% from 25 to 44, 19.6% from 45 to 64, and 12.7% who were 65 years of age or older.  The median age was 32 years. For every 100 females, there were 97.90 males.  For every 100 females age 18 and over, there were 93.90 males.

The median income for a household in the county was $30,813, and for a family was $34,149. Males had a median income of $26,966 versus $19,650 for females. The per capita income for the county was $14,184.  About 14.2% of families and 17.0% of the population were below the poverty line, including 20.9% of those under age 18 and 14.2% of those age 65 or over.

Communities

Cities
 Bovina
 Farwell (county seat)
 Friona

Unincorporated community
 Lazbuddie

Education
School districts:
 Bovina Independent School District
 Farwell Independent School District
 Friona Independent School District
 Hereford Independent School District
 Lazbuddie Independent School District

All of the county is in the service area of Amarillo College.

Gallery

Politics

See also

 Dry counties
 List of museums in the Texas Panhandle
 Recorded Texas Historic Landmarks in Parmer County

References

External links
 Parmer County government’s website
 
 Parmer County Profile from the Texas Association of Counties

 
1907 establishments in Texas
Populated places established in 1907
Texas Panhandle
Majority-minority counties in Texas